The following is a list of Intel Core i5 brand microprocessors. Introduced in 2009, the Core i5 line of microprocessors are intended to be used by mainstream users.

Desktop processors

Nehalem microarchitecture (1st generation)

"Lynnfield" (45 nm) 
 All models support: MMX, SSE, SSE2, SSE3, SSSE3, SSE4.1, SSE4.2, Enhanced Intel SpeedStep Technology (EIST), Intel 64, XD bit (an NX bit implementation), Intel VT-x, Turbo Boost, Smart Cache.
 FSB has been replaced with DMI.
 Transistors: 774 million
 Die size: 296 mm²
 Stepping: B1

Westmere microarchitecture (1st generation)

"Clarkdale" (MCP, 32 nm dual-core) 
 All models support: MMX, SSE, SSE2, SSE3, SSSE3, SSE4.1, SSE4.2, Enhanced Intel SpeedStep Technology (EIST), Intel 64, XD bit (an NX bit implementation), TXT, Intel VT-x, Intel VT-d, Hyper-threading, Turbo Boost, AES-NI, Smart Cache.
 Core i5-655K, Core i5-661 does not support Intel TXT and Intel VT-d.
 Core i5-655K features an unlocked multiplier.
 FSB has been replaced with DMI.
 Contains 45 nm "Ironlake" GPU.
 Transistors: 382 million
 Die size: 81 mm²
 Graphics Transistors: 177 million
 Graphics and Integrated Memory Controller die size: 114 mm²
 Stepping: C2, K0

Sandy Bridge microarchitecture (2nd generation)

"Sandy Bridge" (dual-core, 32 nm) 
 All models support: MMX, SSE, SSE2, SSE3, SSSE3, SSE4.1, SSE4.2, AVX, Enhanced Intel SpeedStep Technology (EIST), Intel 64, XD bit (an NX bit implementation), TXT, Intel VT-x, Intel VT-d, Hyper-threading, Turbo Boost, AES-NI, Smart Cache, Intel Insider, vPro.
 Transistors: 504 million
 Die size: 131 mm²

"Sandy Bridge" (quad-core, 32 nm) 

 All models support: MMX, SSE, SSE2, SSE3, SSSE3, SSE4.1, SSE4.2, AVX, Enhanced Intel SpeedStep Technology (EIST), Intel 64, XD bit (an NX bit implementation), Intel VT-x, Turbo Boost, AES-NI, Smart Cache and Intel Insider.
 Core i5-2400 and Core i5-2500 support TXT, Intel VT-d and vPro.
 All models support dual-channel DDR3-1333 RAM.
S processors feature lower-than-normal TDP (65W on 4-core models).
T processors feature an even lower TDP (45W on 4-core models or 35W on 2-core models).
K processors are unlockable and designed for overclocking. Other processors will have limited overclocking due to chipset limitations.
P processors disable the integrated graphics processor.
 Transistors: 1.16 billion
 Die size: 216 mm²

Ivy Bridge microarchitecture (3rd generation)

"Ivy Bridge" (dual-core, 22 nm) 
 All models support: MMX, SSE, SSE2, SSE3, SSSE3, SSE4.1, SSE4.2, AVX, Enhanced Intel SpeedStep Technology (EIST), Intel 64, XD bit (an NX bit implementation), Intel VT-x, Intel VT-d, Hyper-threading, Turbo Boost, AES-NI, Smart Cache, Intel Insider.
 Die size: 93.6mm² or 118 mm²

"Ivy Bridge" (quad-core, 22 nm) 
 All models support: MMX, SSE, SSE2, SSE3, SSSE3, SSE4.1, SSE4.2, AVX, Enhanced Intel SpeedStep Technology (EIST), Intel 64, XD bit (an NX bit implementation), Intel VT-x, Turbo Boost, AES-NI, Smart Cache, Intel Insider.
All models support dual-channel DDR3-1666 RAM.
S processors feature lower-than-normal TDP (65 W on 4-core models).
T processors feature an even lower TDP (45 W on 4-core models).
K processors have unlocked turbo multiplier
P processors disable the integrated graphics processor
 i5-3470, i5-3470S, i5-3475S, i5-3550, i5-3550S, i5-3570, i5-3570S and i5-3570T support Intel TXT, Intel VT-d and vPro.
 i5-3330, i5-3330S, and i5-3350P support Intel VT-d.
 Non-K processors have limited turbo overclocking (extra 4 turbo bins).
 Transistors: 1.4 billion
 Die size: 133 mm² or 160 mm²

Haswell microarchitecture (4th generation)

"Haswell-DT" (dual-core, 22 nm) 
 All models support: MMX, SSE, SSE2, SSE3, SSSE3, SSE4.1, SSE4.2, AVX, AVX2, FMA3, Enhanced Intel SpeedStep Technology (EIST), Intel 64, XD bit (an NX bit implementation), Intel VT-x, Intel VT-d, Hyper-threading, Turbo Boost, AES-NI, Smart Cache, Intel Insider, vPro.
 Transistors: 1.4 billion
 Die size: 177mm²

"Haswell-DT" (quad-core, 22 nm, 4th generation) 
 All models support: MMX, SSE, SSE2, SSE3, SSSE3, SSE4.1, SSE4.2, AVX, AVX2, FMA3, Enhanced Intel SpeedStep Technology (EIST), Intel 64, XD bit (an NX bit implementation), Intel VT-x, Turbo Boost, AES-NI, Smart Cache, Intel Insider.
 All models apart from Intel i5-4670K support Intel VT-d.
 Intel Core i5-4570, Core i5-4570S, Core i5-4590, Core i5-4590S, Core i5-4590T, Core i5-4670, Core i5-4670S, Core i5-4670T, Core i5-4690, Core i5-4690S, Core i5-4690T support vPro, TXT.
 Transistors: 1.4 billion
 Die size: 185mm²

"Haswell-H" (MCP, quad-core, 22 nm) 
 All models support: MMX, SSE, SSE2, SSE3, SSSE3, SSE4.1, SSE4.2, AVX, AVX2, FMA3, Enhanced Intel SpeedStep Technology (EIST), Intel 64, XD bit (an NX bit implementation), Intel VT-x, Intel VT-d, Turbo Boost, AES-NI, Smart Cache, Intel Insider.
 Core i5-4570R and Core i5-4670R also contain "Crystalwell": 128 MB eDRAM built at (22 nm) acting as L4 cache
 Transistors: 1.4 billion
 Die size: 264mm² + 84mm²

Broadwell microarchitecture (5th generation)

"Broadwell-H" (quad-core, 14 nm)  
 All models support: MMX, SSE, SSE2, SSE3, SSSE3, SSE4.1, SSE4.2, AVX, AVX2, FMA3, Enhanced Intel SpeedStep Technology (EIST), Intel 64, XD bit (an NX bit implementation), Intel VT-x, Intel VT-d, Turbo Boost, AES-NI, Smart Cache, Intel Insider.
 All models also contain "Crystal Well": 128 MB eDRAM built at (22 nm) acting as L4 cache
 Transistors:
 Die size:

Skylake microarchitecture (6th generation)

"Skylake-S" (quad-core, 14 nm)  
 All models support: MMX, SSE, SSE2, SSE3, SSSE3, SSE4.1, SSE4.2, AVX, AVX2, FMA3, Enhanced Intel SpeedStep Technology (EIST), Intel 64, XD bit (an NX bit implementation), Intel VT-x, Intel VT-d, Turbo Boost, AES-NI, Smart Cache, Intel Insider.
 Embedded models also support Intel vPro, Intel TXT.
All models support dual-channel DDR4 2133 RAM.
 Transistors:
 Die size:

"Skylake-H" (quad-core, 14 nm)  
 All models support: MMX, SSE, SSE2, SSE3, SSSE3, SSE4.1, SSE4.2, AVX, AVX2, FMA3, Enhanced Intel SpeedStep Technology (EIST), Intel 64, XD bit (an NX bit implementation), Intel VT-x, Intel VT-d, Turbo Boost, AES-NI, Smart Cache, Intel Insider, Intel TXT, Intel SGX, Intel MPX.
 Transistors:
 Die size:

Kaby Lake microarchitecture (7th generation)

"Kaby Lake-S" (14 nm) 
 All models support: MMX, SSE, SSE2, SSE3, SSSE3, SSE4.1, SSE4.2, AVX, AVX2, FMA3, SGX, MPX, Enhanced Intel SpeedStep Technology (EIST), Intel 64, XD bit (an NX bit implementation), Intel VT-x, Intel VT-d, Turbo Boost, AES-NI, Intel TSX-NI, Smart Cache.
 i5-7500 and up (except K models) also support Intel vPro, Intel TXT.
 Low power models also support configurable TDP (cTDP) down.
 Embedded models also support ECC memory, but do not support Intel TSX-NI.

"Kaby Lake-X" (14 nm) 
 All models support: MMX, SSE, SSE2, SSE3, SSSE3, SSE4.1, SSE4.2, AVX, AVX2, FMA3, SGX, MPX, Enhanced Intel SpeedStep Technology (EIST), Intel 64, XD bit (an NX bit implementation), Intel VT-x, Intel VT-d, Turbo Boost, AES-NI, Intel TSX-NI, Smart Cache.

Coffee Lake microarchitecture (8th/9th generation)

"Coffee Lake-S" (14 nm) 
 All models support: MMX, SSE, SSE2, SSE3, SSSE3, SSE4.1, SSE4.2, AVX, AVX2, FMA3, SGX, MPX, Enhanced Intel SpeedStep Technology (EIST), Intel 64, XD bit (an NX bit implementation), Intel VT-x, Intel VT-d, Turbo Boost, AES-NI, Smart Cache.
 i5-8500 or above also supports: Intel TSX-NI, Intel vPro, Intel TXT.

Comet Lake microarchitecture (10th generation)

"Comet Lake-S" (14 nm) 
 All models support: MMX, SSE, SSE2, SSE3, SSSE3, SSE4.1, SSE4.2, AVX, AVX2, FMA3, SGX, Enhanced Intel SpeedStep Technology (EIST), Intel 64, XD bit (an NX bit implementation), Intel VT-x, Intel VT-d, Hyper-threading, Turbo Boost, AES-NI, Smart Cache.
 All models support up to DDR4-2666 memory.
 Low power and K models also support configurable TDP (cTDP) down.
 Overclocking: Unlocked multiplier on K and KF models.

Cypress Cove microarchitecture (11th generation)

"Rocket Lake-S" (14 nm) 
 All models support: SSE4.1, SSE4.2, AVX, AVX2, AVX-512, FMA3, Enhanced Intel SpeedStep Technology (EIST), Intel 64, XD bit (an NX bit implementation), Intel VT-x, Intel VT-d, Hyper-threading, Turbo Boost, AES-NI, SHA, Smart Cache, DL Boost.
 All models support up to DDR4-3200 memory, and 20 lanes of PCI Express 4.0.
 Low power and K models also support configurable TDP (cTDP) down.
 Overclocking: Unlocked multiplier on K and KF models.

Golden Cove + Gracemont microarchitecture (12th generation)

"Alder Lake" (Intel 7) 
 All models support: SSE4.1, SSE4.2, AVX, AVX2, FMA3, Enhanced Intel SpeedStep Technology (EIST), Intel 64, XD bit (an NX bit implementation), Intel VT-x, Intel VT-d, Hyper-threading, Turbo Boost 2.0, AES-NI, SHA, Smart Cache, Thread Director, DL Boost, GNA 3.0, and Optane memory.
 All models support up to DDR5-4800 or DDR4-3200 memory, and 16 lanes of PCI Express 5.0 + 4 lanes of PCIe 4.0.
 Overclocking: Unlocked multiplier on K and KF models.

Raptor Cove + Gracemont microarchitecture (13th generation)

"Raptor Lake" (Intel 7) 
 All models support: SSE4.1, SSE4.2, AVX, AVX2, FMA3, Enhanced Intel SpeedStep Technology (EIST), Intel 64, XD bit (an NX bit implementation), Intel VT-x, Intel VT-d, Hyper-threading, Turbo Boost 2.0, AES-NI, Smart Cache, Thread Director, DL Boost, and GNA 3.0.

 All models support up to DDR5-4800 or DDR4-3200 memory (i5-13600K support up to DDR5-5600), and 16 lanes of PCI Express 5.0 + 4 lanes of PCIe 4.0.
 Overclocking: Unlocked multiplier on K and KF models.

Mobile processors

Westmere microarchitecture (1st generation)

"Arrandale" (MCP, 32 nm) 
 All models support: MMX, SSE, SSE2, SSE3, SSSE3, SSE4.1, SSE4.2, Enhanced Intel SpeedStep Technology (EIST), Intel 64, XD bit (an NX bit implementation), Intel VT-x, Hyper-threading, Turbo Boost, Smart Cache.
 i5-5xx series (i5-520M, i5-520E, i5-540M, i5-560M, i5-580M, i5-520UM, i5-540UM, i5-560UM) supports AES-NI, TXT and Intel VT-d. 
 FSB has been replaced with DMI.
 Contains 45 nm "Ironlake" GPU.
 Transistors: 382 million
 Die size: 81 mm²
 Graphics Transistors: 177 million
 Graphics and Integrated Memory Controller die size: 114 mm²
 Stepping: C2, K0
 Core i5-520E has support for ECC memory and PCI express port bifurcation.

Sandy Bridge microarchitecture (2nd generation)

"Sandy Bridge" (32 nm) 
 All models support: MMX, SSE, SSE2, SSE3, SSSE3, SSE4.1, SSE4.2, AVX, Enhanced Intel SpeedStep Technology (EIST), Intel 64, XD bit (an NX bit implementation), Intel VT-x, Hyper-threading, Turbo Boost, AES-NI, Smart Cache.
 All models except Core i5-24xxM support TXT and Intel VT-d.
 Core i5-2430M/i5-2435M and i5-2410M/i5-2415M can support AES-NI with laptop OEM-supplied BIOS processor configuration update.
 Core i5-2515E has support for ECC memory.
 Transistors: 624 million
 Die size: 149 mm²

Ivy Bridge microarchitecture (3rd generation)

"Ivy Bridge" (22 nm) 
 All models support: MMX, SSE, SSE2, SSE3, SSSE3, SSE4.1, SSE4.2, AVX, Enhanced Intel SpeedStep Technology (EIST), Intel 64, XD bit (an NX bit implementation), Intel VT-x, Intel VT-d, Hyper-threading, Turbo Boost, AES-NI, Smart Cache.
 i5-3320M, i5-3340M, i5-3360M, i5-3380M, i5-3427U, i5-3437U, i5-3439Y, and i5-3610ME support TXT and vPro.

Haswell microarchitecture (4th generation)

"Haswell-MB" (dual-core, 22 nm) 
 All models support: MMX, SSE, SSE2, SSE3, SSSE3, SSE4.1, SSE4.2, AVX, AVX2, FMA3, Enhanced Intel SpeedStep Technology (EIST), Intel 64, XD bit (an NX bit implementation), Intel VT-x, Hyper-threading, Turbo Boost, AES-NI, Intel TSX-NI, Smart Cache.
 Core i5-4300M and higher also support Intel VT-d, Intel vPro, Intel TXT
 Transistors: 1.3 billion
 Die size: 181 mm²

"Haswell-ULT" (SiP, dual-core, 22 nm) 
 All models support: MMX, SSE, SSE2, SSE3, SSSE3, SSE4.1, SSE4.2, AVX, AVX2, FMA3, Enhanced Intel SpeedStep Technology (EIST), Intel 64, XD bit (an NX bit implementation), Intel VT-x, Hyper-threading, Turbo Boost, AES-NI, Smart Cache.
 Models i5-4250U and up support Intel VT-d
 Core i5-43x0U also supports Intel vPro, Intel TXT
 Transistors: 1.3 billion
 Die size: 181 mm²

"Haswell-ULX" (SiP, dual-core, 22 nm) 
 All models support: MMX, SSE, SSE2, SSE3, SSSE3, SSE4.1, SSE4.2, AVX, AVX2, FMA3, Enhanced Intel SpeedStep Technology (EIST), Intel 64, XD bit (an NX bit implementation), Intel VT-x, Hyper-threading, Turbo Boost, AES-NI, Smart Cache.
 Core i5-4300Y and higher also support Intel VT-d, Intel TSX-NI, Intel vPro, Intel TXT
 Transistors: 1.3 billion
 Die size: 181 mm²

"Haswell-H" (dual-core, 22 nm) 
 All models support: MMX, SSE, SSE2, SSE3, SSSE3, SSE4.1, SSE4.2, AVX, AVX2, FMA3, Enhanced Intel SpeedStep Technology (EIST), Intel 64, XD bit (an NX bit implementation), Intel VT-x, Intel VT-d, Hyper-threading, Turbo Boost (except i5-4402EC and i5-4410E)
 Die size: 181 mm²
 Embedded models support Intel vPro, ECC memory

Broadwell microarchitecture (5th generation)

"Broadwell-H" (dual-core, 14 nm) 
 All models support: MMX, SSE, SSE2, SSE3, SSSE3, SSE4.1, SSE4.2, AVX, AVX2, FMA3, Enhanced Intel SpeedStep Technology (EIST), Intel 64, XD bit (an NX bit implementation), Intel VT-x, Intel VT-d, Hyper-threading, Turbo Boost, AES-NI
 Models with Iris Pro Graphics 6200 also contain "Crystal Well": 128 MB eDRAM acting as L4 cache
 Die size:

"Broadwell-U" (dual-core, 14 nm) 
 All models support: MMX, SSE, SSE2, SSE3, SSSE3, SSE4.1, SSE4.2, AVX, AVX2, FMA3, Enhanced Intel SpeedStep Technology (EIST), Intel 64, XD bit (an NX bit implementation), Intel VT-x, Intel VT-d, Hyper-threading, Turbo Boost, AES-NI, Smart Cache, and configurable TDP (cTDP) down
 Core i5-5300U and higher also support Intel vPro, Intel TXT, and Intel TSX-NI
 Transistors: 1.3-1.9 billion 
 Die size: 82–133 mm²

Skylake microarchitecture (6th generation)

"Skylake-H" (quad-core, 14 nm) 
 All models support: MMX, SSE, SSE2, SSE3, SSSE3, SSE4.1, SSE4.2, AVX, AVX2, FMA3, Enhanced Intel SpeedStep Technology (EIST), Intel 64, XD bit (an NX bit implementation), Intel VT-x, Intel VT-d, Turbo Boost, AES-NI, Smart Cache, Intel TSX-NI.
 Non-embedded models also support configurable TDP (cTDP) down.
 Core i5-6440HQ also supports Intel TXT.
 Embedded models also support Intel vPro, Intel TXT.
 Core i5-6440EQ supports ECC memory.
 Transistors: TBD
 Die size: TBD

"Skylake-U" (dual-core, 14 nm) 
 All models support: MMX, SSE, SSE2, SSE3, SSSE3, SSE4.1, SSE4.2, AVX, AVX2, FMA3, Enhanced Intel SpeedStep Technology (EIST), Intel 64, XD bit (an NX bit implementation), Intel VT-x, Intel VT-d, Turbo Boost, Hyper-threading, AES-NI, Smart Cache, and configurable TDP (cTDP) down
 Core i5-6300U and higher also support Intel vPro, Intel TXT, and Intel TSX-NI.

Kaby Lake microarchitecture (7th/8th generation)

"Kaby Lake-H" (quad-core, 14 nm) 
 All models support: MMX, SSE, SSE2, SSE3, SSSE3, SSE4.1, SSE4.2, AVX, AVX2, FMA3, SGX, MPX, Enhanced Intel SpeedStep Technology (EIST), Intel 64, XD bit (an NX bit implementation), Intel VT-x, Intel VT-d, AES-NI, Intel TSX-NI, Smart Cache, configurable TDP (cTDP) down.
 i5-7400 and up also support Intel vPro, Intel TXT.
 Transistors: TBD
 Die size: TBD
 Embedded models support ECC memory

"Kaby Lake-U" (dual-core, 14 nm) 
 All models support: MMX, SSE, SSE2, SSE3, SSSE3, SSE4.1, SSE4.2, AVX, AVX2, FMA3, SGX, MPX, Enhanced Intel SpeedStep Technology (EIST), Intel 64, XD bit (an NX bit implementation), Intel VT-x, Intel VT-d, Turbo Boost, Hyper-threading, AES-NI, Smart Cache, and configurable TDP (cTDP).
 Low power models i5-7300U and i5-7360U also support Intel vPro, Intel TXT.

"Kaby Lake-Y" (dual-core, 14 nm) 
 All models support: MMX, SSE, SSE2, SSE3, SSSE3, SSE4.1, SSE4.2, AVX, AVX2, FMA3, SGX, MPX, Enhanced Intel SpeedStep Technology (EIST), Intel 64, XD bit (an NX bit implementation), Intel VT-x, Intel VT-d, Turbo Boost, Hyper-threading, AES-NI, Smart Cache, Intel TSX-NI, and configurable TDP (cTDP).
 i5-7Y57 also supports Intel vPro, Intel TXT.

"Kaby Lake Refresh" (quad-core, 14 nm) 
 All models support: MMX, SSE, SSE2, SSE3, SSSE3, SSE4.1, SSE4.2, AVX, AVX2, FMA3, SGX, MPX, Enhanced Intel SpeedStep Technology (EIST), Intel 64, XD bit (an NX bit implementation), Intel VT-x, Intel VT-d, Turbo Boost, Hyper-threading, AES-NI, Smart Cache, and configurable TDP (cTDP).

"Kaby Lake-G" (quad-core, 14 nm)

"Amber Lake-Y" (dual-core, 14 nm)

Coffee Lake microarchitecture (8th/9th generation)

"Coffee Lake-H" (quad-core, 14 nm)

"Coffee Lake-U" (quad-core, 14 nm)

"Coffee Lake-B" (hexa-core, 14 nm)

"Whiskey Lake-U" (quad-core, 14 nm)

"Amber Lake-Y" (quad-core, 14 nm)

Comet Lake microarchitecture (10th generation)

"Comet Lake-H" (quad-core, 14 nm)

"Comet Lake-U" (quad-core, 14 nm) 
 i5-10310U also supports Intel vPro, Intel TXT.

Sunny Cove microarchitecture (10th generation)

"Ice Lake-U" (quad-core, 10 nm) 
 All models support: MMX, SSE, SSE2, SSE3, SSSE3, SSE4.1, SSE4.2, AVX, AVX2, AVX-512, FMA3, SGX, Speed Shift Technology (SST), Intel 64, XD bit (an NX bit implementation), Intel VT-x, Intel VT-d, Turbo Boost, Hyper-threading, AES-NI, SHA, Smart Cache, DL Boost, and configurable TDP (cTDP).

"Ice Lake-Y" (quad-core, 10 nm) 
 All models support: MMX, SSE, SSE2, SSE3, SSSE3, SSE4.1, SSE4.2, AVX, AVX2, AVX-512, FMA3, SGX, Speed Shift Technology (SST), Intel 64, XD bit (an NX bit implementation), Intel VT-x, Intel VT-d, Turbo Boost, Hyper-threading, AES-NI, SHA, Smart Cache, DL Boost, and configurable TDP (cTDP).

Willow Cove microarchitecture (11th generation)

"Tiger Lake-H" (10 nm SuperFin) 
 All models support: SSE4.1, SSE4.2, AVX2, AVX-512, FMA3, Speed Shift Technology (SST), Intel 64, Intel VT-x, Intel VT-d, Turbo Boost, Hyper-threading, AES-NI, SHA, Smart Cache, DL Boost, Optane memory, GNA 2.0, IPU6, TB4, and configurable TDP (cTDP).

"Tiger Lake-H35" (10 nm SuperFin) 
 All models support: SSE4.1, SSE4.2, AVX2, AVX-512, FMA3, Speed Shift Technology (SST), Intel 64, Intel VT-x, Intel VT-d, Turbo Boost, Hyper-threading, AES-NI, SHA, Smart Cache, DL Boost, Optane memory, GNA 2.0, IPU6, TB4, and configurable TDP (cTDP).

"Tiger Lake-UP3" (10 nm SuperFin) 
 All models support: SSE4.1, SSE4.2, AVX2, AVX-512, FMA3, Speed Shift Technology (SST), Intel 64, Intel VT-x, Intel VT-d, Turbo Boost, Hyper-threading, AES-NI, SHA, Smart Cache, DL Boost, Optane memory, GNA 2.0, IPU6 (except SRK05), TB4, and configurable TDP (cTDP).
 -RE models support ECC memory.
 1145 also supports Intel vPro, Intel TXT.

"Tiger Lake-UP4" (10 nm SuperFin) 
 All models support: SSE4.1, SSE4.2, AVX2, AVX-512, FMA3, Speed Shift Technology (SST), Intel 64, Intel VT-x, Intel VT-d, Turbo Boost, Hyper-threading, AES-NI, SHA, Smart Cache, DL Boost, Optane memory, GNA 2.0, IPU6, TB4, and configurable TDP (cTDP).
 1140 also supports Intel vPro, Intel TXT.

Golden Cove + Gracemont microarchitecture (12th generation)

"Alder Lake-HX" (Intel 7) 
 All models support: SSE4.1, SSE4.2, AVX, AVX2, FMA3, Enhanced Intel SpeedStep Technology (EIST), Intel 64, XD bit (an NX bit implementation), Intel VT-x, Intel VT-d, Hyper-threading, Turbo Boost 3.0, AES-NI, SHA, Smart Cache, Thread Director, DL Boost, and GNA 3.0.
 All models support up to DDR5-4800 or DDR4-3200 memory, and 20 lanes of PCI Express 5.0/4.0.
 12600HX also supports Intel vPro, Intel TXT.

"Alder Lake-H" (Intel 7) 
 All models support: SSE4.1, SSE4.2, AVX, AVX2, FMA3, Enhanced Intel SpeedStep Technology (EIST), Intel 64, XD bit (an NX bit implementation), Intel VT-x, Intel VT-d, Hyper-threading, Turbo Boost 2.0, AES-NI, SHA, Smart Cache, Thread Director, DL Boost, and GNA 3.0.
 All models support up to DDR5-4800, LPDDR5-5200, DDR4-3200, or LPDDR4X-4266 memory, and 28 lanes of PCI Express 4.0/3.0.
 Embedded models also support configurable TDP (cTDP) down.

"Alder Lake-P" (Intel 7) 
 All models support: SSE4.1, SSE4.2, AVX, AVX2, FMA3, Speed Shift Technology (SST), Intel 64, Intel VT-x, Intel VT-d, Hyper-threading, Turbo Boost, AES-NI, SHA, IPU6, TB4, Smart Cache, Thread Director, DL Boost, and GNA 3.0.
 All models support up to DDR5-4800, LPDDR5-5200, DDR4-3200, or LPDDR4X-4266 memory, and 20 lanes of PCI Express 4.0/3.0.
 1250 also supports Intel vPro, Intel TXT, and XD bit.

"Alder Lake-U" (Intel 7) 
 All models support: SSE4.1, SSE4.2, AVX, AVX2, FMA3, Speed Shift Technology (SST), Intel 64, Intel VT-x, Intel VT-d, Hyper-threading, Turbo Boost, AES-NI, IPU6 (except SRLFR), TB4, Smart Cache, Thread Director, DL Boost, and GNA 3.0.
 Support 20 lanes (UP3) or 14 lanes (UP4) of PCI Express 4.0/3.0.
 All models support up to LPDDR5-5200 or LPDDR4X-4266 memory
 Standard power models also support up to DDR5-4800 or DDR4-3200 memory.
 Model numbers 1240 and higher also support Intel vPro, Intel TXT, and XD bit.

Raptor Cove + Gracemont microarchitecture (13th generation)

"Raptor Lake-HX" (Intel 7)

"Raptor Lake-H" (Intel 7)

"Raptor Lake-PX" (Intel 7)

"Raptor Lake-P" (Intel 7)

"Raptor Lake-U" (Intel 7)

See also
 Intel Core
 List of Intel Celeron microprocessors
 List of Intel Pentium microprocessors
 List of Intel Core i3 microprocessors
 List of Intel Core i7 microprocessors
 List of Intel Core i9 microprocessors

Notes

References

External links
 Intel Core i5 desktop processor product order code table
 Intel Core i5 mobile processor product order code table
 Search MDDS Database
 Intel ARK Database

Core i5
Intel Core i5